Balkrishna (known as Acharya Balkrishna, born 4 August 1972) is an Indian billionaire businessman and chairman of the consumer goods company Patanjali Ayurved. He was reported by Forbes to have a net worth of  billion . According to Ashish Kumar of Arya Samaj, Balkrishna has successfully established and managed a global business without a formal education.

Early life
Balkrishna was born on 4 August 1972 in Haridwar, Uttarakhand (then Uttar Pradesh) to Nepalese immigrants, Sumitra Devi and Jay Vallabh Subedi originating from Syangja, Nepal. He spent his childhood in Nepal. He returned to India and studied at Khanpur Gurukul in Haryana, where he met Ramdev.

Career
On 5 January 1995, Balkrishna, Ramdev, and Acharya Karamveer founded Divya Yoga Mandir Trust which was set up at the Kripalu Bagh Ashram in Haridwar. In 2006, they founded Patanjali Ayurved, a fast-moving consumer goods (FMCG) company involved in the manufacturing and trading of FMCG, herbal, and ayurvedic products. Followers of Ramdev, NRIs Sunita and Sarwan Poddar, helped kick-start the business with a loan. According to Balkrishna, he had taken out a ₹50–600 million loan at a time when he had never held a personal bank account in his name. Patanjali Ayurved's revenue from operations increased marginally to ₹9,022.71 crore in the year up to 31 March 2020, Revenue stood at about ₹8,522.68 crore in FY19.

While Ramdev does not hold a stake in Patanjali Ayurved, he is the face of the firm and endorses its products to his followers across his yoga camps and television programmes. Balkrishna owns 94% of the company and serves as its managing director. He is a close aide of Ramdev. Acharya Balkrishna listed in India's 50 most influential personalities 2020. He was reported India's third-youngest billionaire by Forbes India Rich List 2020. He is also second billionaire of Nepalese Origin.

Personal life
Balkrishna lives in Haridwar, Uttarakhand, and is unmarried.

Posts 
General Secretary, Divya Yog Mandir (Trust).
General Secretary, Patanjali Yogpeeth (Trust).
 managing director, Patanjali Ayurved Limited.
 Vice Chancellor, Patanjali University 
 General Secretary, Patanjali Gramodhyog Trust 
 Chief Editor, Yog Sandesh
 General Secretary, Patanjali Research Foundation

Awards 

 Balkrishna was awarded the Champions of Change award in 2019, for his work in the field of Ayurved.
 Acharya Balkrishna was awarded the "UNSDG 10 Most Influential People in Healthcare Award", for his work in Healthcare sector.
 Acharya Balkrishna received "Best Wellness Impact Global award" from the CFI.co.
 Acharya Balkrishna honoured with "Bheeshma Puraskar" by Sant shree Gyaneshwar Gurukul, Pune.
 Acharya Balkrishna was awarded with AIMA Managing India Award 2018 for the "Transformational Business Leader of the Year" by Central Minister Rajyavardhan Singh Rathore. 
 Acharya Balkrishna was awarded with "Shalin Manav Ratna Award- 2018" By Anoopam Mission for his contribution towards social welfare and Ayurveda.
 Acharya Balkrishna honoured with "Degree of Doctor of letter (Yoga) (Honoris Causa)" by S-Vyasa Deemed University Swami Vivekananda Yoga Anusandhana Samsthana for outstanding work done in the field of Yoga and Ayurveda.
 Acharya honoured with "Geeta Ratna Samman" by Spirituality Consciousness Association in January 2018 for his contribution towards Yoga and Ayurveda.
 Acharya Balkrishna was awarded with "Indian of the Year Business Category- 2017" for his contribution to the country to strengthened the foundation of our society and has helped build Brand India in the process by CNN-News 30 November 2017
 Acharya Balkrishna was awarded with "Jashn-e-Youngistan Samman for Business Icon of the Year" by News 24.
 Acharya Balkrishna honoured with "Lokmanya Tilak Award 2017" by Tilak Smarak Trust on 1 August 2017 for his contribution towards promotion Yoga & Ayurveda
 Acharya Balkrishna Ji awarded with "Bloomberg Special Recognition Award" On 22 March 2016 for outstanding contribution in the field of Ayurveda.
 Acharya Balkrishna, was bestowed with "Bharat Gaurav" award by Kaptan Singh Solanki, Governor of Haryana and Punjab in recognition of his amazing work in the field of Ayurveda at a programme organised by Indian International Friendship Society at New Delhi on Saturday.

References

External links
Balkrishna's profile in Forbes

1972 births
Businesspeople from Uttarakhand
Indian billionaires
Indian people of Nepalese descent
People from Haridwar
Living people
Ramdev